Flournoy is a surname. Notable people with the surname include:

 Angela Flournoy, American novelist
 Anne Flournoy (born 1952), American writer, producer and film director
 Craig Flournoy (born 1951), American journalist, Pulitzer Prize winner
 Dequinte Oshea Flournoy, convicted of aggravated battery as part of the Murder of Brandon Brown
 Fabulous Flournoy (born 1973), basketball player and coach
 Francis Flournoy, Kentucky farmer, the first of two people indicted under the Logan Act
 Harry Flournoy (1943–2016), college basketball player
 Houston I. Flournoy (1929–2008), California State Controller and professor of public administration
 John Flournoy (1808–1879), American deaf activist
 Melissa Scott Flournoy, Louisiana state representative, defeated for state senate in 1996 by Max T. Malone
 Michèle Flournoy (born 1961), Under Secretary of Defense for Policy of the United States
 Nancy Flournoy (born 1947), American statistician
 Peggy Flournoy (1904–1972), American football and baseball player and coach
 Peter Flournoy, player for Jacksonville State Gamecocks football, signed by Detroit Lions
  (1901–1967), American screenwriter
 Samuel Lightfoot Flournoy (West Virginia lawyer) (1886–1961), American lawyer and politician
 Samuel Lightfoot Flournoy (West Virginia senator) (1846–1904), American lawyer and politician
 Sterling Flournoy, American heavy metal musician, member of Prong (band)
 Terri Williams-Flournoy (born 1969), college basketball coach
 Théodore Flournoy (1854–1920), Swiss psychologist
 Thomas Flournoy (1811–1883), U.S. Representative from Virginia and cavalry officer in the Confederate States Army
 Thompson B. Flournoy, Colonel of the 1st Arkansas Infantry Regiment
 Willis Flournoy (1895–?), African-American baseball pitcher

See also
 Flournoy (disambiguation)